The Pakistan cricket team toured New Zealand from December 2010 till February 2011 to play two Tests, three Twenty20s (T20) and six One Day Internationals (ODIs). Three tests were initially planned but as the 2011 Cricket World Cup was held from February to April, one test was dropped and one ODI and the three T20s were added.

Tour matches

Twenty20 series

1st T20I

New Zealand bowler Tim Southee took five wickets in eight balls, including a hat-trick. He became the first New Zealander to take a five wicket haul in an T20I match.

2nd T20I

3rd T20I

Test series

1st Test

New Zealand bowler Chris Martin took his 500th wicket in first-class cricket, with the dismissal of Tanvir Ahmed.

2nd Test

Daniel Vettori's first innings score of 110 was his sixth century in Test cricket. Pakistan's wicket keeper, Adnan Akmal, took six catches in the first innings.

ODI series

1st ODI

2nd ODI

3rd ODI

4th ODI

5th ODI

6th ODI

Media coverage
NEO Cricket
STAR Cricket
SAB TV
GEO Super
Pakistan Television Corporation (PTV)
Sky Sport (New Zealand)
Sky Sports

References 

2010 in New Zealand cricket
2010 in Pakistani cricket
2010–11 New Zealand cricket season
2011 in New Zealand cricket
2011 in Pakistani cricket
International cricket competitions in 2010–11
2010-11